Brenda Zambrano (born 13 July 1993) is a Mexican model, social media influencer, showgirl and media personality.

Biography 
Brenda has five siblings on her mother's side and two on her father's side since they separated.

She participated in a reality show, "Half and Half" where she was looking for a partner but she had no significance. What she managed to transcend is her Instagram account where she was traveling, and she showed her statuesque and beautiful figure. That is why she was called to participate in a new reality show, Acapulco Shore.

Brenda was selected to participate in the first season but she declined the offer because she did not want to leave her partner at the time, shortly after she agreed to participate in the second season.

Thus began her career in the world of reality shows, Brenda was part of the main cast of Acapulco Shore during the second season and then returned for the fifth and sixth seasons. The success of this show led her and her classmates to become internet personalities, influencers with many followers.

After leaving Acapulco Shore, she decided to become a YouTuber, calling her channel, "Brenda, con liminetes, now yes" where she talked about her life, she showed her looks, fashion blogs, among others stuff.

In 2020 she returned to the world of reality shows, this time to Guerreros, integrating the Cobras team. Brenda's participation lasted only one month and one week, as she became the fourth eliminated, in her second nomination, by public vote.

In 2022 she participated in the second season of Resistire, it is produced by MTV, integrating the orange team, although only for four weeks since Brenda would be expelled for violating the program's rules after skipping the exit door.

In May she joined La casa de los famosos, in her second season in which she is still in the game.

Filmography

Reality shows

References

1993 births
Living people
People from Ciudad Victoria
Mexican female models
Mexican YouTubers
Reality television participants